Hu Jun (Simplified Chinese: 胡俊) (born 24 January 1985 in Qingdao) is a Chinese football player.

Club career
Hu Jun would start his professional football career after he graduated from the various Qingdao Jonoon youth teams and make his debut on May 4, 2005 in a league game against Inter Shanghai in a 1-0 loss. During the season, he would make 3 further cameo appearances in the league, however it wasn't until the following league season that Hu Jun would start to establish himself as a club regular within the team when he made 13 league appearances. Established now as regualer member within the team he would eventually score his first senior club level goal on June 28, 2008 against Guangzhou Pharmaceutical, however his team lost 2-7.

On 25 January 2012, Hu Jun signed a half-year contract with Portuguese side Varzim S.C. and play in the remainder of the 2011–12 Segunda Divisão. Hu Jun would soon make his debut for his new club in a league game against F.C. Tirsense on February 5, 2012 in a 1-0 victory where he came on as a substitute. While he would only play in a handful of games Hu Jun would actually see Varzim lift the third tier title before he returned to China.

On 17 July 2013, Hu Jun joined Tuen Mun, alongside Qingdao Jonoon teammate Feng Tao, through the referral of Zola Kiniambi. This deal is a loan deal as Hu Jun is loaned from Qingdao Jonoon until the end of the season. In March 2016, Hu was loaned to China League Two side Yinchuan Helanshan until 31 December 2016.

Hu returned to Qingdao Jonoon in February 2018.

Career statistics
Statistics accurate as of match played 31 December 2020.

References

External links
HU JUN at Soccerway.com

1985 births
Living people
Chinese footballers
Footballers from Qingdao
Qingdao Hainiu F.C. (1990) players
Varzim S.C. players
Tuen Mun SA players
Hong Kong First Division League players
Chinese Super League players
China League One players
Chinese expatriate footballers
Expatriate footballers in Portugal
Chinese expatriate sportspeople in Portugal
Expatriate footballers in Hong Kong
Association football midfielders